Rose Marie is a 1936 American musical film starring  Jeanette MacDonald, Nelson Eddy, and Reginald Owen that was directed by W. S. Van Dyke. It was the second of three movie adaptations from Metro-Goldwyn-Mayer of the 1924 Broadway musical of the same name. A silent version was released in 1928 and a color film in 1954. All three versions are set in the Canadian wilderness. Portions of Rudolf Friml and Herbert Stothart's original score for the Broadway musical are utilized in both the 1936 and 1954 films.

Although the original plot was changed, and most of the songs were dropped, the 1936 film was a huge success and became MacDonald and Eddy's best-known film. Their duet of "Indian Love Call"  was a major hit for the two singers and remained a signature song throughout their careers.

Plot
Marie de Flor (Jeanette MacDonald) is a Canadian soprano performing in Roméo et Juliette in Montreal; the Premier of Quebec is in the audience. Inviting him and his entourage to supper after the performance, she learns from a 'half-breed' man called Boniface (George Regas), that her brother Jack (James Stewart), supposedly in prison for armed robbery, was wounded as he escaped from prison and has killed a Mountie in the process. Making her excuses, she leaves for the Canadian wilderness with Boniface, hoping to help Jack.

At the same time, Sergeant Bruce, of the Mounties (Nelson Eddy) reports to headquarters and receives his latest mission: he must find Jack Flower, believed to be hiding near Lake Chibougam.

Marie and Boniface reach an outpost near Lake Chibougam, where Boniface disappears with Marie's money. Marie falls in with Sergeant Bruce, but Marie cannot tell him the truth for fear of compromising Jack. Marie tries singing at a local cafe to earn some money, but is unused to such boisterous singing and fails to attract any tips.

Bruce insists that Marie report Boniface's theft, but she cannot admit her real identity, calling herself 'Rose'. But Bruce has recognised her via her voice. They travel together to an Indian ceremony that night. Bruce, despite his strong sense of duty, proves to be a womaniser, and they sing together.  Marie finds Boniface and they leave together. But Bruce has discovered that 'Rose Marie de Flor' is really Jack Flower's sister and sets off after her, knowing that she will lead him to Jack.

Boniface and Marie travel on horseback to Hayman's Landing where Jack is hiding. Sergeant Bruce, following her, rescues her from drowning as they cross a deep river and Boniface runs off into the forest.

Marie haughtily refuses the Sergeant's help, but realises that she will not reach John without that help. She and the Sergeant travel together for the next three days, before she leaves him with a new guide.

Marie finds Jack being nursed by Boniface's mother, and tries to persuade him to reform. She gives him the money necessary to escape and start over. But Bruce appears and arrests Jack. Marie begs him to let her brother go, but the Sergeant is unmoved by her plea.

No more is heard of Jack, but Marie, although unwell, returns to opera performance. She has the title role in the opera Tosca. She keeps imagining that she hears "Indian Love Call" throughout the opera and collapses onstage just before the final curtain. She retires to a mountain lodge and refuses to sing for six months. Her manager, Myerson, visits and tells her how disappointed he is not to hear her voice again. After he leaves, she begins singing "Indian Love Call". Myerson urges Sergeant Bruce, who has been waiting in the foyer, to join her, and they sing together.

Cast

 Jeanette MacDonald as Marie de Flor
 Nelson Eddy as Sergeant Bruce
 Reginald Owen as Myerson
 Allan Jones as Romèo and Mario Cavaradossi (opera scenes)
 James Stewart as Jack Flower
 Alan Mowbray as Premier of Quebec
 George Regas as Boniface
 Una O'Connor as Anna
 Robert Greig as Saloon and Hotel Owner
 James Conlin as Joe, the pianist
 Gilda Gray as Belle
 David Niven as Teddy (as David Nivens)
 Herman Bing as Mr. Daniells
An extra in the film, Robert Barr Miller, appeared in the credits under his real name at the same time that he was being sought by authorities for robbery and murder in northern California.

Songs

 Overture: "Indian Love Call" and "Rose Marie"
 Scenes from Romèo et Juliette (music by Charles Gounod, libretto by Jules Barbier and Michel Carré)
 "Pardon Me, Madame"
 "The Mounties"
 "Dinah" (music by Harry Akst, lyrics by Sam Lewis and Joe Young)
 "Some of These Days" (Shelton Brooks)
 "Rose Marie"
 "Totem Tom-Tom"
 "Just For You"
 "Three Blind Mice"
 "Indian Love Call" (sung four times)
 Act III of Tosca, from Tosca's entrance (music by Giacomo Puccini, libretto by Giuseppe Giacosa and Luigi Illica)
 "Indian Love Call (reprise)"

Production
While footage of the Mounties in boot camp was filmed in Canada, location filming with the lead actors was at Lake Tahoe. The film was originally slated to be in color but makeup man Fred Phillips explained that when this was dropped, the studio ordered him to change Eddy's makeup for the worse. Phillips stated that orders came from Louis B. Mayer, who was angry at Eddy for his personal involvement in MacDonald's life.

Reception
The New York Times reviewer Frank S. Nugent enthused that "this is Miss MacDonald's and Mr. Eddy's picture", a "musical feast" in which "whether singing solo or in duet, they prove to be fully as delightful a combination here as they were in the film of Victor Herbert's 'Naughty Marietta'".

The film is recognized by American Film Institute in these lists:
 2002: AFI's 100 Years...100 Passions – Nominated
 2004: AFI's 100 Years...100 Songs:
 "Indian Love Call" – Nominated

References

 Green, Stanley (1999) Hollywood Musicals Year by Year (2nd ed.), pub. Hal Leonard Corporation  page 51

External links

 
 
 
 
 Rose-Marie at Virtual History

1936 films
American romantic musical films
American black-and-white films
Films directed by W. S. Van Dyke
Films set in Canada
Metro-Goldwyn-Mayer films
Royal Canadian Mounted Police in fiction
Films about law enforcement in Canada
Operetta films
Films scored by Herbert Stothart
Films scored by Rudolf Friml
1930s romantic musical films
1930s English-language films
1930s American films